Antonino D'Agata (23 February 1882 in Avola – 26 February 1947) was an Italian politician. He represented the Italian Communist Party in the Constituent Assembly of Italy from 1946 to 1947.

References

1882 births
1947 deaths
People from Avola
Italian Communist Party politicians
20th-century Italian politicians
Members of the Constituent Assembly of Italy
Politicians of Sicily